The Men's national basketball team of Palestine represents Palestine in international basketball competitions. It is managed by the Palestinian Basketball Federation.

The team won a bronze medal in the 1964 FIBA Africa Championship for men. Also, the team took a tenth-place finish in the 2015 FIBA Asia Championship.

Competitions

FIBA Africa Championship

FIBA Asia Cup

West Asian Championship

Team

Current roster

2021 FIBA Asia Cup qualification
Venue: Khalifa Sport City, Manama

Opposition: Kazakhstan (February 19, 2021)
Opposition: Sri Lanka (February 21, 2021)

Past roster

2021 FIBA Asia Cup qualification
Opposition: Kazakhstan (February 21)
Venue: Saryarka Velodrome, Nur-Sultan
Opposition: Sri Lanka (February 24)
Venue: Arab American University, Jenin

2015 FIBA Asia Championship

Coaches

References

External links
FIBA profile

Men's national basketball teams
Palestine national basketball team